The Irondequoit Gully, or more commonly known in colloquial terms as simply, The Gully, is a path created by a stream that flows to Irondequoit Bay in New York State, United States. The Gully was once a trolley route. Most of The Gully runs through private backyards.

The sides of the gully are  embankments. There is evidence of the mass transit system with the remnants of bridges, cements posts sticking out of the ground, and as well as building foundations.

Geography of New York (state)